Eacott is a surname. Notable people with the surname include:

 John Eacott (born 1960), British jazz trumpeter and composer
 Len Eacott (born 1947), Australian Anglican archbishop

See also
 LazarBeam (born 1994), real name Lannan Eacott, professional gamer